Kharma Records was a short-lived jazz record label run by Dan Serro specializing in free jazz and avant-garde jazz music. Many of the label's releases are considered highly collectible today.

Discography

External links
Discogs

Jazz record labels